Martti Järvinen (born 21 September 1933) is a Finnish footballer. He played in two matches for the Finland national football team from 1955 to 1957.

References

External links
 

1933 births
Living people
Finnish footballers
Finland international footballers
Place of birth missing (living people)
Association footballers not categorized by position